Grupo Medianova (English: Medianova group) is a privately owned media publisher in Angola. The group publishes printed newspapers and magazines, operates a TV station and a radio programme, with web presences of all published media. Medianova also owns its own distributing company to get their printed publications around.

Medianova's products include: 
 O País weekly newspaper with Web site
 Semanário Económico (Angola) O jornal da economia Angolana e do mundo
 Socijornal
 Revista Exame
 Rádio Mais (Angola) 
 TV Zimbo

See also
Edições Novembro the State owned (E.P.) media publisher (Jornal de Angola, Jornal de Economia, Jornal dos Desportes)

References

External links
 Corporate Web site of Medianova Group
 List of media published by Medianova and other subsidiaries
 Sobre Nós (About us) Dossier in O País; collection of articles on the Medianova Group 

Mass media companies of Angola
Mass media in Angola